The Rural City of Wangaratta is a local government area in the Hume region of Victoria, Australia, located in the north-east part of the state. It includes the towns of Cheshunt, Eldorado, Everton, Glenrowan, Greta, Greta West, Milawa, Moyhu, Oxley, Tarrawingee, Wangaratta and Whitfield. It was formed in 1994 from the amalgamation of the City of Wangaratta, Shire of Wangaratta, Shire of Oxley, and parts of the United Shire of Beechworth, Shire of Benalla and Shire of Yarrawonga. When formed the municipality was originally called the Shire of Milawa, but a few months later, was renamed to its current name.

The Rural City is governed and administered by the Wangaratta Rural City Council; its seat of local government and administrative centre is located at the council headquarters in Wangaratta. The Rural City is named after the main urban settlement located in the north of the LGA, that is Wangaratta, which is also the LGA's most populous urban centre with a population of around 18,500.

Council

Current composition
The council is composed of three wards and seven councillors, with four councillors elected to the City Ward and one councillor per remaining ward elected to represent each of the other wards. As of July 2021, the seven councillors are:

History

The election of Councillors in 2016 followed a three year period where the Council was governed by Administrators. Administrators had been appointed by an Act of Parliament, following the dismissal of the Councillors elected at the 2012 general election. A panel of three administrators, by an Act of Parliament, was appointed to oversee the council until the 2016 municipal elections.

Administration and governance
The councillors meet in the council chambers at the council headquarters in the Wangaratta Government Centre, which is also the location of the council's administrative activities. It also provides customer services at its administrative centre in Wangaratta.

Townships and localities
The 2021 census, the rural city had a population of 29,808 up from 28,310 in the 2016 census

^ - Territory divided with another LGA

See also
 List of localities (Victoria)
 List of places on the Victorian Heritage Register in the Rural City of Wangaratta

References

External links
Wangaratta Rural City Council official website
Metlink local public transport map
Link to Land Victoria interactive maps

Local government areas of Victoria (Australia)
Hume (region)
 
Wangaratta